The Hunza cuisine also called the Burusho cuisine consists of a series of selective food and drink intake practiced by the Burusho people (also called the Hunza people) of northern Pakistan that is argued by some to be unique and have long lasting effects. The diet mostly consists of raw food including nuts, fresh vegetables, dry vegetables, mint, fruits and seeds added with yogurt. The cooked meal, daal included with chappati, is included for dinner. It has also been advocated for being inexpensive and mostly self-producible. The Hunza lifestyle  was referenced in the Biorhythm Calendar published by the American Health Institute  in the later 1970s.

Proponents
The Irish physician Robert McCarrison is believed to have traveled to this area during the days of the British Raj and tested this diet on rats in England. The results are claimed to have given the rats longer lasting lives. In his book about the Hunza, Jay Hoffman argued that by the ratio to cats, dogs and horses, humans should live up to 120 to 150 years and argues the Hunza diet to be the key to this longevity.

See also
 Longevity myths
 Pakistani cuisine

References

External links
 The Truth, Myths, and Lies About the Health and Diet of the "Long-Lived" People of Hunza, Pakistan, and Hunza Bread and Pie Recipes
 You are what you eat – Hunza diet for long lifetime and happiness
 Health Secrets Of The Hunzas Donald G. Garty, personal coach
 Health Secrets Of The Hunzas  Christian H. Godefroy
 Hunza Bread Travel & culture
 Authentic Hunza bread Cookingclinic

Gerontology
Hunza
Longevity myths
Nutrient-rich, low calorie diets
Pakistani cuisine